Charles Thomas King (6 December 1911 – 19 July 2001) was an English cyclist. He won a bronze medal in the 1936 Berlin Olympics in the 4000m team pursuit with Ernest Mills, Ernest Johnson  and Harry Heaton Hill.

He emigrated to New Zealand in the 1950s, where he remained active in the cycling scene as a custom frame builder under the marquee PRENDERO. He was also an active member of the Auckland Cycle Touring Association where he was president in the 1990s and a lifetime member.

References
Charles King's profile at Sports Reference.com
Auckland Cycle Touring Assoc. 60th Jubilee Photos

1911 births
2001 deaths
English male cyclists
Olympic cyclists of Great Britain
Cyclists at the 1936 Summer Olympics
Olympic bronze medallists for Great Britain
Olympic medalists in cycling
People from Putney
Cyclists from Greater London
Medalists at the 1936 Summer Olympics